Omorgus testudo is a species of hide beetle in the subfamily Omorginae and subgenus Afromorgus.

References

testudo
Beetles described in 1927